Car Trouble is a 1986 British comedy film starring Julie Walters, Ian Charleson and Vincent Riotta.
The film has been described as a coarse British farce comedy.

Plot
In the throes of a midlife crisis, a man buys a 1965 Jaguar E-Type sports car and it immediately becomes his new love. What he does not know is that his wife is as attracted to the Jaguar salesman as he is to the car. The wife and lover experience penis captivus in the car after a reckless accident.

Cast
 Julie Walters as Jacqueline
 Ian Charleson as Gerald
 Vincent Riotta as Kevin (as Vincenzo Ricotta)
 Stratford Johns as Reg Sampson 
 Hazel O'Connor as Maureen 
 Dave Hill as Bill 
 Anthony O'Donnell as Frederick 
  Vanessa Knox-Mawer as Judy Monk 
  Roger Hume as Mr. Hollybush 
  Veronica Clifford as Mrs. Hollybush

References

External links
Review of film at Time Out

1986 comedy films
1986 films
British comedy films
1980s English-language films
1980s British films